Ryazansky District is an administrative and municipal district (raion), one of the twenty-five in Ryazan Oblast, Russia. It is located in the northwest of the oblast. Its administrative center is the city of Ryazan (which is not administratively a part of the district). Population: 56,869 (2010 Census);

Administrative and municipal status
Within the framework of administrative divisions, Ryazansky District is one of the twenty-five in the oblast. The city of Ryazan serves as its administrative center, despite being incorporated separately as a city of oblast significance—an administrative unit with the status equal to that of the districts.

As a municipal division, the district is incorporated as Ryazansky Municipal District. The city of oblast significance of Ryazan is incorporated separately from the district as Ryazan Urban Okrug.

Economy and transportation
The Solotchinskoye peat narrow gauge railway serves a peat factory which became operational in 2010.

References

Notes

Sources

External links
 

Districts of Ryazan Oblast

